Banco Português de Investimento (BPI) is a major privately owned bank in Portugal owned by Spanish bank CaixaBank.  It runs the banking business with companies, institutional and private clients. As Sociedade Portuguesa de Investimentos it was founded in 1981 by Artur Santos Silva. It is the third largest private Portuguese financial group with assets of €112.9 billion (in 2009). Chairman and CEO is Fernando Ulrich. The bank is headquartered in Porto.

The commercial banking group Banco BPI has more than 1.4 million customers, individuals, businesses and institutions. Through its multi-channel distribution network with 674 branches, 30 investment centers and branches, the bank specializes in home loans through a network of outside companies. The bank is primarily active in Portugal and Spain, Angola and Mozambique. In Angola, BPI is the market leader in corporate banking and its activity reached a 25% market share on its 50.1% stake in Banco de Fomento Angola (BFA) with 750,000 customers (as at December 2010). In Mozambique, the BPI maintains a 30 percent stake in the bank BCI Fomento.

On 25 October 2007, BPI offered a merger proposal with Millennium BCP, the largest private bank of Portugal. However, the board of BCP rejected the proposal.

Until 2017 the bank's shares were listed in the  Euronext Lisbon's PSI-20 stock index. CaixaBank raised its stake from 45% to 84.5% in 2017, took the bank private, and then acquired all the remaining shares the following year.  , 100 percent of the shares are held by the Spanish bank CaixaBank.

Logo

References

External links

Banks of Portugal
Banks established in 1981
Companies based in Porto
CaixaBank